The William P. Mason House is a historic house located in Swansea, Massachusetts.

Description and history 
It is a -story, wood-framed structure, with a side gable roof and clapboard siding. The main facade is asymmetrical, with an off-center gable and its entry sheltered by a bracketed hood. A -story ell extends to the rear, with a porch extending along its side. The house was built in about 1860, and is a fine local example of vernacular Gothic Revival styling. It occupied a prominent role in the village of Barneyville, serving as hotel, tavern, and post office at various times before about 1930, when it reverted to strictly residential use.

The house was listed on the National Register of Historic Places on August 8, 1990.

See also
National Register of Historic Places listings in Bristol County, Massachusetts

References

Houses in Bristol County, Massachusetts
Swansea, Massachusetts
Houses on the National Register of Historic Places in Bristol County, Massachusetts